Hemiancistrus furtivus is a species of catfish in the family Loricariidae. It is native to South America, where it occurs in the Esmeraldas River basin in Ecuador. The species reaches 9.98 cm (3.9 inches) SL and was described in 2017 by Francisco Provenzano and Ramiro Barriga of the Central University of Venezuela, who report its placement in the genus Hemiancistrus to be tentative and suggest that it may belong to the tribe Hypostomini rather than Ancistrini, where it is currently placed. As of May 2022, FishBase does not list this species.

References 

Ancistrini
Fish described in 2017